Gangneung station is a railway station on the Yeongdong Line and Gangneung Line in Gyo-dong, Gangneung, Gangwon, South Korea. All Sea Trains and Mugunghwa trains stopped at this station until September 14, 2014 when it was closed because of the construction of the Gangneung Line. Because of this, all Mugunghwa trains had terminated at Jeongdongjin station.

The Gangneung Line and Gangneung station opened at December 22, 2017. The KTX-Sancheon (now KTX-Eum) trains started stopping here. However, the Mugunghwa-ho trains terminated at Jeongdongjin station before July 18, 2018, before all of the Mugunghwa trains that terminated at Jeongdongjin got cut back to Donghae. This is because there were many KTX-Sancheon because of the 2018 Winter Olympics in Pyeongchang County.

Gallery

External links

 Cyber station information from Korail

Railway stations in Gangwon Province, South Korea
Buildings and structures in Gangneung
Tourist attractions in Gangneung
Railway stations opened in 1962